John Dunmoe BDec (also Dunmow, Dumoe, Dunow or Dunowe) (died 25 January 1489) was a Canon of Windsor from 1450 to 1455 and Archdeacon of Gloucester from 1487 to 1489 and Bishop of Limerick from 1486 to 1489.

Dunmow is described by Canon Begley as a canon of Exeter, Doctor of Laws and acting as ambassador from Henry VII to the Papal court in Rome. He died in 1489 having never visited his diocese. He is also listed as an auxiliary bishop of the Diocese of Exeter.

Career
He was appointed:
Rector of Hanworth, Middlesex 1432
Prebendary of Barnby in York 1475 - 1481
Rector of St Magnus London Bridge 1481 - 1489
Archdeacon of Gloucester 1487
Rector of Church of St Peter ad Vincula 1488
Bishop of Limerick 1486 - 1489
King's Proctor at Rome

He was appointed to the ninth stall in St George's Chapel, Windsor Castle in 1476 and held the canonry until 1488.

Notes 

1489 deaths
Canons of Windsor
Archdeacons of Gloucester
Roman Catholic bishops of Limerick
Year of birth unknown